Slavutych Arena is a football-only stadium in Zaporizhzhia, Ukraine. It is used for football matches and is the home of Metalurh Zaporizhzhia. The stadium's official maximum capacity is 12,000.

Central Stadium Metalurh
The stadium was built in 2006 in place of another stadium that was called Central Stadium Metalurh (or Metalurh Stadium) and which existed since 2 May 1938. The new stadium was built after complete demolishing of the previous stadium. In 2001, the Football Federation of Ukraine suspended the Metalurh Stadium and Metalurh played most of its home games at the AvtoZAZ Stadium which was a home ground of FC Torpedo Zaporizhzhia.

Slavutych Arena
After the 2001-02 season, the Central Stadium Metalurh was completely demolished and on its place started to be built a new stadium. On 29 July 2006, the new Slavutych Arena was officially opened. After finishing of the new stadium, Metalurh played its games at new home stadium since July 2006.

The stadium is located on the left-bank of Dnieper near the well known Dnieper Hydro-Electric Station and the Metallurgists Park. Located in a central part of the city, Slavutych Arena is away from main train station, airport and major automobile highways.

The Slavutych Arena hosted the 2010 Ukrainian Super Cup final between Shakhtar Donetsk and Tavriya Simferopol. Shakhtar, the reigning league champions, won 7–1 in front of a crowd of 10,500.

It also hosted the 2019 Ukrainian Cup Final between Shakhtar Donetsk and Inhulets Petrove, a 4-0 Shakhtar victory.

Due to ongoing conflict in Luhansk, FC Zorya Luhansk also plays home games at the stadium.

Gallery

References

External links
  Information on FC Metalurh website
 Images at StadiumDB.com

Football venues in Ukraine
Sport in Zaporizhzhia
Buildings and structures in Zaporizhzhia
FC Metalurh Zaporizhzhia
FC Zorya Luhansk
Sports venues in Zaporizhzhia Oblast
Sports venues completed in 2006